Bernard 'Benny' Berg (14 September 1931 – 21 February 2019) was a Luxembourgish politician and trade unionist.  In the 1970s, Berg was a leading member of the Luxembourg Socialist Workers' Party, sitting in the Chamber of Deputies and the communal council of Dudelange.  When fellow LSAP deputy Raymond Vouel left the government to join the European Commission, Berg took Vouel's place in the Thorn Ministry as Deputy Prime Minister under Gaston Thorn.  He would serve in the government again under Pierre Werner.

References

Deputy Prime Ministers of Luxembourg
Members of the Chamber of Deputies (Luxembourg)
Councillors in Dudelange
Luxembourg Socialist Workers' Party politicians
1931 births
People from Dudelange
2019 deaths